Éva Tauszk (November 16, 1924 – 2 October 1967) was a Hungarian internist, candidate of medical sciences.

She studied at the University of Szeged, and also in Budapest. From 1961 to 1963 she worked as an adjunct at Semmelweis University. She studied the genesis of heart attack, as well as endocrinological problems.

Main work 
 A szívizom-infarctus néhány kérdéséről: Kandidátusi értekezés. MTA, TMB Budapest, 1963.

References

Sources 
 Magyar életrajzi lexikon
 
 Új magyar életrajzi lexikon
 

1924 births
1967 deaths
Hungarian endocrinologists
Women endocrinologists
Deaths from cancer in Hungary
20th-century Hungarian physicians